The 2015 Chang-Sat Bangkok Open was a professional tennis tournament played on hard courts. It was the seventh edition of the tournament which was part of the 2015 ATP Challenger Tour. It took place in Bangkok, Thailand between 31 August and 6 September 2015.

Singles main-draw entrants

Seeds

 1 Rankings are as of August 17, 2015.

Other entrants
The following players received wildcards into the singles main draw:
  Phassawit Burapharitta
  Puriwat Chatpatcharoen
  Pruchya Isaro
  Kittipong Wachiramanowong

The following players received entry from the qualifying draw:
  Oliver Anderson
  Christopher Rungkat 
  Finn Tearney 
  Andrew Whittington

Champions

Singles

  Yūichi Sugita def.  Marco Trungelliti 6–4, 6–2

Doubles

 Bai Yan /  Riccardo Ghedin def.  Chen Ti /  Li Zhe 6–2, 7–5

External links
Official Website

 
 ATP Challenger Tour
Tennis, ATP Challenger Tour, Chang-Sat Bangkok Open
Tennis, ATP Challenger Tour, Chang-Sat Bangkok Open

Tennis, ATP Challenger Tour, Chang-Sat Bangkok Open
Tennis, ATP Challenger Tour, Chang-Sat Bangkok Open